The 1991 California Angels season involved the Angels finishing 7th in the American League West with a record of 81 wins and 81 losses.

Offseason
December 2, 1990: Devon White was traded by the California Angels with Willie Fraser and Marcus Moore to the Toronto Blue Jays for a player to be named later, Junior Felix, and Luis Sojo. The Toronto Blue Jays sent Ken Rivers (minors) (December 4, 1990) to the California Angels to complete the trade.
December 13, 1990: Max Venable was signed as a free agent with the California Angels.
March 14, 1991: Dante Bichette was traded by the California Angels to the Milwaukee Brewers for Dave Parker.

Regular season

Season standings

Record vs. opponents

Transactions
April 1, 1991: Rick Schu was released by the California Angels.
June 3, 1991: Mark Sweeney was drafted by the California Angels in the 9th round of the 1991 amateur draft. Player signed June 5, 1991.
July 30, 1991: Shawn Abner was traded by the San Diego Padres to the California Angels for Jack Howell.
September 7, 1991: Dave Parker was released by the California Angels.

Roster

Player stats

Batting

Starters by position
Note: G = Games played; AB = At bats; H = Hits; Avg. = Batting average; HR = Home runs; RBI = Runs batted in

Other batters
Note: G = Games played, AB = At bats; H = Hits; Avg. = Batting average; HR = Home runs; RBI = Runs batted in

Starting pitchers
Note: G = Games pitched; IP = Innings pitched; W = Wins; L = Losses; ERA = Earned run average; SO = Strikeouts

Other pitchers
Note: G = Games pitched; IP = Innings pitched; W = Wins; L = Losses; ERA = Earned run average; SO = Strikeouts

Relief pitchers
Note: G = Games pitched; W = Wins; L = Losses; SV = Saves; ERA = Earned run average; SO = Strikeouts

Farm system

LEAGUE CHAMPIONS: Boise

References

1991 California Angels at Baseball Reference
1991 California Angels  at Baseball Almanac

Los Angeles Angels seasons
Los
Los